Marinin is a Russian masculine surname, its feminine counterpart is Marinina. It may refer to
Alexandra Marinina, pen name of the Russian writer Marina Alekseyeva (born 1957)
Maxim Marinin (born 1977), Russian pair skater

Russian-language surnames